The 2020–21 Taipei Fubon Braves season was the first season of the franchise in the P. LEAGUE+ (PLG), its 7th in the Taipei City and playing home games at Taipei Heping Basketball Gymnasium. They are coached by Hsu Chin-Che in his fourth year as head coach.

Preseason 
On September 9, 2020, former Taiwanese professional basketball player Blackie Chen announced the establishment of P. LEAGUE+ (PLG). The first game of PLG was started on December 19, 2020.

Draft 
The P. LEAGUE+ (PLG) did not hold a draft in its first season.

Standings

Roster

Game log

Preseason

Regular season

Regular season note 
 Due to the COVID-19 pandemic, the Taoyuan City Government and Taoyuan Pilots declared that the games in Taoyuan Arena would be played behind closed doors from January 16, 2021 to February 7, 2021.

Finals

Finals note 
 Due to the COVID-19 pandemic, the league officials declared that Game 3 and Game 4 would be played behind closed doors and Game 5 to Game 7 would be cancelled.

Player Statistics 
<noinclude>

Regular season

Playoffs

 Reference：

Transactions

Free Agency

Re-signed

Additions

Subtractions

Awards

Finals Awards

End-of-Season Awards

Players of the Month

Players of the Week

References 

Taipei Fubon Braves seasons
Tai